E. Holman Clark (1864–1925) was a British stage actor. He also appeared in seven silent films. He became famous for his annual Christmas performance as Captain Hook in J.M. Barrie's Peter Pan. In 1920 he played the title role in Walter C. Hackett's Mr. Todd's Experiment at the Queen's Theatre.

Filmography
 A Message from Mars (1913)
 The Brass Bottle (1914)
 Red Pottage (1918)
 Her Heritage (1919)
 Once Aboard the Lugger (1920)
 False Evidence (1922)
 The Naked Man (1923)

References

Bibliography

External links

1864 births
1925 deaths
British male stage actors
English male film actors
English male silent film actors
20th-century English male actors
People from East Hoathly